Tazewell may refer to:

People
Tazewell (name)

Places

United States
Tazewell, Georgia
Tazewell, Virginia
Tazewell County, Virginia
Tazewell, Tennessee
Tazewell County, Illinois